IIES may refer to:

 Insurance Information and Enforcement System
 Institute for International Economic Studies